WNNL (103.9 FM) is an Urban Gospel formatted station serving the Raleigh/Durham metropolitan region.  Owned by Radio One with WQOK and WFXC/WFXK, "The Light 103.9" is "The Triangle's #1 Station for Inspiration" and home to the Yolanda Adams morning show.  Its studios are located in Raleigh and its transmitter site is in Fuquay-Varina, the station's city of license.

WNNL broadcasts two channels in the HD radio format.

History
WAKS-FM was a Country station in Fuquay-Varina, North Carolina and sister station to WAKS/1460 when it signed on in 1981. In 1987 the station became easy listening WAZZ. In 1989 the station moved to Cary, North Carolina and began playing smooth jazz as WNND "The Wind".

After financial problems, WNND was sold to Clear Channel and switched to a classic hits format, with the call letters WZZU, previously used by what is now WNCB. The current format began in October 1997 on WZZU and WDUR.

Clear Channel owned WNNL, WFXC, WFXK and WQOK until 2000 when the stations were spun off to Radio One for Clear Channel to meet ownership caps following their acquisition of AMFM.

References

External links
Official Website

 

Urban One stations
Gospel radio stations in the United States
NNL
Fuquay-Varina, North Carolina